Friedrich Kirchner (26 March 1885 – 6 April 1960) was a German general during World War II who commanded 1st Panzer Division and the LVII Panzer Corps. He was a recipient of the Knight's Cross of the Iron Cross with Oak Leaves and Swords.

Career
Friedrich Kirchner joined the Royal Saxon Army in 1899 and became an officer in 1907. During World War I he served with the 23d Division. After World War I he was retained in the Reichsheer. Kirchner was promoted to Major in 1928 and from 1929 he served in the staff of a cavalry division. Since 1 October 1933, he commanded a battalion in the 11th Cavalry Regiment in Neustadt (now Prudnik, Poland). Kirchner was promoted to Oberst in 1934 and appointed to command an infantry regiment in the 1st Panzer Division on 15 October 1935 and commanding officer of an infantry brigade on 10 November 1938. He was promoted to Generalmajor in March 1938.

He participated in the invasion of Poland as a brigade commander; he was appointed command of the 1st Panzer Division in November 1939. On 1 April 1940 he was promoted to Generalleutnant. Kirchner led the division in the Battle of France and was awarded the Knight’s Cross of the Iron Cross on 20 May 1940. He then took command of the LVII Armeekorps on 15 November 1941 and remained in command of the unit (re-designated LVII Panzer Corps) until the end of World War II.

He was taken prisoner by US forces in May 1945 and released in 1947.

Awards
 Iron Cross (1914) 2nd Class (1 October 1914) & 1st Class (26 September 1917)
 Clasp to the Iron Cross (1939) 2nd Class (22 September 1939) &1st Class (4 October 1939)
 German Cross in Gold on 22 April 1942 as Generalleutnant and commander of the 1. Panzer-Division
 Knight's Cross of the Iron Cross with Oak Leaves and Swords
 Knight's Cross on 20 May 1940 as Generalleutnant and commander of the 1. Panzer-Division
 Oak Leaves on 12 February 1944 as General der Panzertruppe and commanding general of the LVII. Panzer-Korps
 Swords on 26 January 1945 as General der Panzertruppe and commanding general of the LVII. Panzer-Korps

References

Citations

Bibliography

 
 
 
 
 

1885 births
1960 deaths
Generals of Panzer Troops
Recipients of the Gold German Cross
Recipients of the Knight's Cross of the Iron Cross with Oak Leaves and Swords
Military personnel from Leipzig
Recipients of the clasp to the Iron Cross, 1st class
German Army personnel of World War I
German Army generals of World War II